Crepe rubber is coagulated latex that is rolled out in crinkled sheets and commonly used to make soles for shoes and boots but also a raw material for further processed rubber products.

Processing
Colloidal latex is first mixed with formic acid to cause it to coagulate. The coagulum is processed in a "creping battery", a series of machines that crush, press and roll the coagula. The sheets are hung in a heated drying shed and then sorted by grade and packed for shipping.

Types
There are several types and grades of rubber crepe, mainly distinguished by the grade and pre-processing of the latex used in their manufacture.
Pale latex crepe (PLC) is a premium grade, made from raw field latex.
Estate brown crepe (EBC) is made from "cup lump" (raw, naturally coagulated rubber from the collection cup) and other coagula. 
Re-milled crepe is made from "wet slab coagulum" (cured latex, still wet from the coagulation tanks), latex sheets (unsmoked) and cup lump.
Smoked blanket crepe is made from thick sheets of latex that have been processed in a smoker.
Flat bark crepe is made from scraps and other poor quality raw product.

Gallery

References

Rubber